The Wounded Personnel Medal is awarded to members of and civilians employed by the Armed Forces of the Philippines who are injured or killed in combat with the enemy.

Design

Medal 
The medal is in the form of a cross in gold.. Superimposed in the center of a cross is a disc where a relief head of Gen Gregorio del Pilar is placed facing front. The wreath made of light green laurel leaves superimposed the cross. The cross signifies the risk of life while in combat; the disc with the head of General Del Pilar is for achievements that resulted in the wounding of an awardee by an armed enemy; the wreath symbolizes honor for such endeavor; and the green color stands for nobility and devotion to duty.

Ribbon 
The ribbon is white with purple stripe in the center.

See also
 Awards and decorations of the Armed Forces of the Philippines

References

Citations

Bibliography
 The AFP Adjutant General, AFP Awards and Decorations Handbook, 1995, 1997, OTAG.

Orders, decorations, and medals of the Philippines
Military awards and decorations of the Philippines